Etuéboué is a town in south-eastern Ivory Coast. It is a sub-prefecture of Adiaké Department in Sud-Comoé Region, Comoé District.

Etuéboué was a commune until March 2012, when it became one of 1126 communes nationwide that were abolished.
In 2014, the population of the sub-prefecture of Etuéboué was 22,569.

Villages
The eighteen villages of the sub-prefecture of Etuéboué and their population in 2014 are:
 Abiaty  (1 897)
 Aby-Mohoua  (1 402)
 Adjouan-Mohoua  (7 716)
 Afforénou-Poste  (355)
 Angboudjou  (1 020)
 Akounougbé  (3 346)
 Akpagne-Poste  (232)
 Anzé-Assanou  (262)
 Ebouando 1  (201)
 Ebouando 2  (387)
 Egbéi  (259)
 Ehono-Egnanganou  (185)
 Elima  (766)
 Essoukporéty  (185)
 Etuéboué  (1 834)
 Kacoukro-Lagune  (263)
 Man-Man  (1 081)
 M'braty  (1 178)

References

Sub-prefectures of Sud-Comoé
Former communes of Ivory Coast